Arne Hjertsson (4 September 1918 – 12 June 1987) was a Swedish footballer who played as a forward.

References

1918 births
1987 deaths
Association football forwards
Swedish footballers
Allsvenskan players
Malmö FF players